Henry Foot (21 November 1805 – 14 May 1857) was an English-born cricketer who played for Victoria. He was born in Romsey, Hampshire and died in Brighton, Victoria.

Foot made a single first-class appearance for the side, during the 1851–52 season, against Tasmania. From the opening order, he scored 20 runs in the first innings in which he batted, and 2 runs in the second.

References

External links
Henry Foot at Cricket Archive

1805 births
1857 deaths
English cricketers
Victoria cricketers
People from Romsey
Melbourne Cricket Club cricketers
English emigrants to colonial Australia
Cricketers from Hampshire